Johann Müller (22 March 1912 – 11 October 1984) was an Austrian footballer. He played in two matches for the Austria national football team in 1945.

References

External links
 

1912 births
1984 deaths
Austrian footballers
Austria international footballers
Place of birth missing
Association footballers not categorized by position